Christian Cointat (born 11 July 1943 in Tresques) is a member of the Senate of France.  He represents the constituency of French citizens living abroad, and is a member of the Union for a Popular Movement.

References
Page on the Senate website

1943 births
Living people
People from Gard
Rally for the Republic politicians
Union for a Popular Movement politicians
Gaullism, a way forward for France
French Senators of the Fifth Republic
Senators of French citizens living abroad